The South Carolina Baptist Convention (SCBC) is a group of churches affiliated with the Southern Baptist Convention, located in the U.S. state of South Carolina. Headquartered in Columbia, South Carolina, the convention is made up of 44 Baptist associations and around 2,000 churches as of 2010.

The convention was founded in December 1821 at First Baptist Church of Columbia with 9 total messengers in attendance.  Richard Furman was elected as the first president of the convention and William Bullein Johnson was elected as the first vice-president of the SCBC. At this time there were 213 churches across seven associations.
Furman's pupil, William Bullein Johnson, who served from 1825 to 1852, succeeded him upon his death and became the first president of the Southern Baptist Convention from 1845 to 1851 after the split with the Triennial Convention over the issue of slavery.

As of 2000, there were 1,878 churches affiliated with the Southern Baptist Convention in South Carolina, with 928,341 adherents.

Furman University
In 1825, the Convention elected a board to organize an institution to train young men for the ministry. The Furman Academy and Theological Institution was established the following year. It officially opened in January 1827 and was named in honor of Richard Furman, a Baptist minister and education pioneer. Furman University severed its association with the Convention in 1992. The South Carolina Baptist Historical Collection, containing the archives of the Convention through 2002, is located at Furman.

Affiliated Organizations 
Baptist Courier - State Newspaper
Connie Maxwell Children's Home
South Carolina Baptist Foundation
South Carolina Baptist Ministries for the Aging
White Oak Conference Center
Woman's Missionary Union

Affiliated Universities
Anderson University
Charleston Southern University
North Greenville University

See also
Preston Callison

References

External links
South Carolina Baptist Convention
 

Baptist Christianity in South Carolina
Conventions associated with the Southern Baptist Convention
Religious organizations established in 1821
Baptist denominations established in the 19th century
1821 establishments in South Carolina